An assessment centre is a process where candidates are examined to determine their suitability for specific types of employment, especially management or military command.  The candidates' personality and aptitudes are determined by techniques including interviews, group exercises, presentations, examinations and psychometric testing.

History
An early example of assessment is the story of Gideon selecting the most suitable Israelite warriors:

In modern times, the German army introduced assessment techniques for selecting its officers in the 1930s.  Psychologist Max Simoneit was appointed to head the army's laboratory and introduced leadership tests.  These were terminated in 1941 after too many favoured candidates had failed them.

Assessment centres were created in World War II to select officers and are still commonly used in military recruitment today.  Examples include the Admiralty Interview Board of the Royal Navy and the War Office Selection Board of the British Army.
After World War 2, The OSS type of assessment centre was essentially abandoned in The United States except for some internal use in intelligence gathering operations by the CIA. The British Civil Service Selection Board and Australians identified participants still used it for selection on their military college. Also, South Africans used the technique to identify supervisors in gold mines.
 
Assessment centres specifically applied for industrial usage can be traced back to the early 1950s and the pioneering work of Robert K Greenleaf and Douglas W. Bray of the American Telephone & Telegraph Company (AT&T). Douglas W. Bray as a director of human resources at AT&T, directed a study that lasted over 20 years and followed the careers of young business managers as they progressed up the telephone company rankings. This study showed that the assessment centre method could successfully predict organizational achievement and was later implemented throughout  AT&T and later on adopted by many other companies: IBM, Standard Oil (Ohio) and Sears for example.

In 1975, the first guidelines on the use of assessment centres was created as a statement of the considerations believed to be most important for all users of the assessment center method. The guidelines ensure the integrity of the process, the validity of the data, qualifications of assessors, and the rights of the participants. The guidelines have since been revised several times to reflect current legality issues, global insights, and technological advances in the field. The most current version of the Guidelines and Ethical Considerations for Assessment Center Operations was endorsed by the 38th International Congress on Assessment Methods in Alexandria, Virginia in October 2014.
Today, The ACM is used by organizations all over the world in both private and public sectors to better select of employees and identifying their development in different areas.

AT&T created a building for recruitment of staff in the 1950s.  This was called The Assessment Centre and was influential on subsequent personnel methods in other businesses.

Other companies use this method to recruit for their graduate programmes by assessing the personality and intellect of potential employees who have recently graduated from university and have nil or limited work history. The big four accountancy firms conduct assessment centre days to recruit their trainees. 72% of employers in the UK and USA now use some form of assessment centre as part of their recruitment/promotion process. In recent years companies have been set up to support assessment centre coaching.

Purpose
Assessment centre is not just a building for assessing a job candidate, it is a process of evaluation of behaviour based on multiple evaluation including: job related simulations, interviews or psychological tests.

The ultimate reason for having an assessment centre in any organization is to gather all relevant information under a standardized conditions about an individual's capabilities to perform a given task. Assessment centres are often the method of choice for selecting senior leaders in government and municipal jobs, including police chief and fire captains.

During the process of assessing candidates, series of exercises that are designed to simulate the condition of a given job are given to the candidate to do. This helps the assessor to determine if the candidate possesses the necessary skill and behaviour needed for the job.

The assessment centre method provides a sort of wide-ranging, multidimensional assessment that has a strong record of both research significance and practical effectiveness to be accepted by participants and decision-makers alike. 
In essence, the purpose of assessment centre is to examine the skills and psychological state of an individual in order to determine his or her performance.

References

Examinations
Psychological testing
British Army in World War II
German Army (1935–1945)